Jani Kalevi Kristian Mäkelä (born 21 October 1976) is a Finnish politician currently serving in the Parliament of Finland for the Finns Party at the South-Eastern Finland constituency.

References

Living people
Members of the Parliament of Finland (2015–19)
Members of the Parliament of Finland (2019–23)
Finns Party politicians
21st-century Finnish politicians
1976 births